"Cortez the Killer" is a song by Canadian singer-songwriter Neil Young from his 1975 album, Zuma. It was recorded with the band Crazy Horse. It has since been ranked No. 39 on Guitar World's 100 Greatest Guitar Solos and No. 329 on Rolling Stone's list of the 500 Greatest Songs of All Time.

Young has stated in concert that he wrote the song while studying history in high school in Winnipeg. According to Young's notes for the album Decade, the song was banned in Spain under Francisco Franco. According to El País and book author Xavier Valiño, the album Zuma was released in Spain in full following Franco's death, with the song renamed to the less inflammatory title "Cortez".

Lyrics and interpretation

The song is inspired by Hernán Cortés (Cortés' name has an alternate Anglicized spelling in the song title), a conquistador who conquered Mexico for Spain in the 16th century. "Cortez the Killer" also makes reference to the Aztec ruler Moctezuma II and the Spanish conquest of the New World.

Instead of describing Cortés' battles with the Aztecs, the lyric in the last verse suddenly jumps from third person narrative to first person, and possibly over a time span of centuries as well, with a reference to an unnamed woman: "And I know she's living there / And she loves me to this day. / I still can't remember when / or how I lost my way."  Young had recently gone through his breakup with Carrie Snodgress around this time.

On a more cynical note, in Jimmy McDonough's biography of Young, Shakey, the author asked Neil if his songs were autobiographical. Young replied, "What the fuck am I doing writing about Aztecs in 'Cortez the Killer' like I was there, wandering around? 'Cause I only read about it in a few books. A lotta shit I just made up because it came to me."

Rolling Stone critiqued the song's idyllic view of Mesoamerica, noting that despite the song's contention that "War was never known" to the Aztecs, in actuality they were "in a near-constant state of war", and that while the song claims people sacrificed themselves "so others could go on", in reality "Innocent people were tied to posts and brutally tortured and killed."

Composition
The song is typical of the Zuma album—simple, big chords and a bass line that sometimes becomes very powerful and fades again. The song repeats the chords Em7, D and Am7sus4 while Young adds his signature solos throughout. It is played in double drop D (DADGBD).

The lyrics start 3:23 into the song. First the words picture Cortés and his "galleons and guns" on their quest of the new world shores. There lived Montezuma, emperor of the Aztecs, inconceivably rich and full of wisdom, but in a civilization doomed despite its beauty and amazing achievements. By immense human toll of building, their huge and still existing pyramids had been erected, and are praised in the song.

Also of note is that the song fades out after nearly seven and a half minutes, as (according to Young's father in Neil and Me) an electrical circuit had blown, causing the console to go dead. In addition to losing the rest of the instrumental work, a final verse was also lost. When producer David Briggs had to break this news to the band, Young replied "I never liked that verse anyway." The additional verse has not been identified or recorded officially.

Cover versions
 The song was covered in studio album Three of a kind by Vanja Orlandić (2013)
 The song was covered live by Slint, with a version being released on the 2014 reissue of Spiderland.
 The song has been covered live by the Dave Matthews Band, with Warren Haynes, at their concert in Central Park in 2003.
 Built to Spill recorded a version for their 2000 album Live that, with several guitar solos throughout, came to over twenty minutes in length.
 It was also covered by The Church on A Box of Birds (1999). 
 Gov't Mule covered the song on their 1998 album Live ... With a Little Help from Our Friends. 
 A live version by Matthew Sweet appears on the Legacy edition of Girlfriend.
 Reed Mathis, Willy Waldman, and Stephen Perkins. Grace Potter continues to cover the song in her concerts.
 Singer-songwriter Marissa Nadler covered the song on a bonus EP to her 2007 album Songs III: Bird on the Water.
 Screaming Females released a cover of this song on a 2008 7" split with "Hunchback".
 David Rawlings covered the song on his 2009 album A Friend of a Friend, where it appears as the latter half of a medley; the first section is the Bright Eyes song "Method Acting".
 Jim Jarmusch, Bradford Cox and Randy Randall covered the song in 2009 for a video on the website of Pitchfork Media.
 Metal band Prong covered the song on the 2015 covers album Songs from the Black Hole.
 Dinosaur Jr. and J Mascis and the Fog frequently cover the song live with lengthy improvised guitar solos. Both bands feature J Mascis on guitar.
 The Lemonheads covered the song during their March 1991 show at Markthalle Hamburg and were joined by Bill Janovitz of Buffalo Tom

References

1975 songs
Neil Young songs
Songs written by Neil Young
Song recordings produced by David Briggs (record producer)
Songs about Native Americans
Songs about explorers
Songs about Mexico
Cultural depictions of Hernán Cortés
Song recordings produced by Neil Young
Crazy Horse (band) songs